Carmelo Rado (born 4 August 1933) is an Italian athletics competitor.  He competed for his native country in the discus throw at the 1960 Olympics held in his home country, finishing in seventh place.  He also competed in the 1962 European Athletics Championships.

Biography
Rado grew up in Biella, and has lived in South Africa and San Donato Milanese.  He currently lives in Calusco d'Adda, Bergamo.

Rado has continued to throw into the upper age divisions of masters athletics.  He holds the current M70, M75 and M80 world record in the discus throw, the M75 and M80 world record in the weight pentathlon and the M80 world record in the weight throw.

See also
 List of Italian records in masters athletics

References

External links
 

1933 births
Living people
Italian male discus throwers
Athletes (track and field) at the 1960 Summer Olympics
Olympic athletes of Italy
Italian masters athletes
World record setters in masters athletics
20th-century Italian people